BPE may refer to:

Businesses and organisations 
 Banco Popular Español, banking group in Spain
 Bureau of Public Enterprises, in Nigeria
 Bráithreachas Phoblacht na hÉireann (BPÉ), the Irish Republican Brotherhood 1858-1924

Science and technology 
 Benign prostatic hyperplasia, benign prostate enlargement
 .500 Black Powder Express (.500 BPE)
 Borated polyethylene, a lightweight neutron absorber
 Byte pair encoding
 ASME BPE, a standard published by the American Society of Mechanical Engineers (Bioprocessing Equipment)

Other uses 
 IATA code for Qinhuangdao Beidaihe Airport, China
 Bachelor of Physical Education